Brian's Return is a 1999 wilderness survival novel written by Gary Paulsen and the fourth novel in the Hatchet series.

It was also released as Hatchet: The Call by Macmillan Children's Books in the UK on January 8, 1999. This was originally supposed to be the final Hatchet book in the series, but hundreds of readers asked Paulsen to make one more. So in response, he published Brian's Hunt in 2003.

Plot
Brian is having trouble fitting in with urban society and is sent to see a psychologist, a blind ex-police officer named Caleb. Caleb recognizes that Brian's home is the wilderness. At Caleb's suggestion, Brian returns to the Canadian wilderness, knowing that is where his heart truly is.

References

1999 American novels
Novels by Gary Paulsen
American adventure novels
American young adult novels
Novels about survival skills